Terminal is the third full-length album by the Norwegian band Ancestral Legacy, released under Norwegian record label Whispering Voice Records on 
September 29, 2014.

Background 
Terminal is an album with less symphonic black metal elements than its distant predecessor Nightmare Diaries (2010), switching to a greater mix of gothic metal and doom metal, utilizing the usual mixture of light female vocals and harsh male vocals.

It's the first album with Mexican singer Isadora Cortina (guest musician in Trapped Within the Words), who joined the band after the longtime vocalist Elin Anita Omholt had an injury in a car accident in 2008.

Releases 
30 CDs were released in slim jewel cases, 6 each with the colours red, orange, green, blue and purple, with a 4-page booklet.

Track listing

Personnel

Ancestral Legacy 
Isadora Cortina - Vocals (female)
Eddie Risdal - Guitars, Vocals (harsh)
Tor Arvid Larsen - Guitars
Christopher Midtsvéen Vigre- Drums
Jarl Ivar Brynhildsvoll - Bass

Guest/session musicians 
Jone Väänänen - Keyboards, Effects
Jean-Baptiste Frichet - Bass on track 10
Øyvind Rosseland - Keyboards on track 3
Anette Ødegaard, Sune Berthelsen - Choir on tracks 4, 6, 7, 12

Production and engineering 
 Jone Väänänen	- Mixing, Mastering

References

External links 
Discogs.com
Metallum Archives

2014 albums
Ancestral Legacy albums